Bleptina caradrinalis, the bent-winged owlet or variable snout moth, is a species of moth of the family Erebidae. It was described by Achille Guenée in 1852. It is found in North America, from Nova Scotia west to British Columbia, south to Arizona. Furthermore, it is found from southern North America south to Brazil and on the Antilles.

Adults are on wing from June to August depending on the location.

The larvae feed on the leaves of barberry, clover and hickory.

References

External links

Mention of range outside of North America

Hypeninae
Moths described in 1852
Moths of South America
Moths of North America
Taxa named by Achille Guenée